The Galilee Forces (Quwat al-Jalil) are a Palestinian militia allied with the Ba'athist Syrian government, currently fighting in the Syrian Civil War. Its serves as the armed wing of the Movement of the Youth of the Palestinian Return (Harakat Shabab al-Oudat al-Falastinia). The Galilee Forces have a sub-unit, the Badr Brigades, which is active in Aleppo.

See also 

List of armed groups in the Syrian Civil War

References 

Arab nationalism in Syria
Arab nationalist militant groups
Palestinian militant groups
Palestinians in Syria
Pro-government factions of the Syrian civil war
2010s establishments in Syria
Jihadist groups in Syria
Axis of Resistance